Thyborøn is a fishing village in Jutland, Denmark with a population of 1,890 (1 January 2022), primarily famous for being the site of numerous shipwrecks, such as that of the Imperial Russian naval vessel Alexander Neuski.

It is located in Region Midtjylland in Lemvig Municipality.

Thyborøn is the western terminus of the Limfjord canal that cuts across the Jutland peninsula.

It is the location of the Sea War Museum Jutland.

Notable people 
 Johnny Madsen (born 1951 in Thyborøn) a Danish musician, songwriter and painter
 Henning Toft Bro (born 1956 in Thyborøn) a Danish prelate, the Bishop of Aalborg 
 Louise Gade (born 1972 in Thyborøn) a Danish cand.jur., president of Aarhus VIA University College and former Mayor of Aarhus, Denmark

References

External links
Weather forecast Thyborøn, Denmark weather-atlas.com

Cities and towns in the Central Denmark Region
Fishing communities
Lemvig Municipality